Russian disinformation campaigns have occurred in many countries. For example, in Africa, disinformation campaigns led by Yevgeny Prigozhin have been reported in several countries. Russia, however, denies that it uses disinformation to influence public opinion.

Background 
During the Cold War the Soviet Union used propaganda and disinformation as part of its "active measures...against the populations of Western nations"." During the administration of Boris Yeltsin, the first President of Russia after the collapse of the Soviet Union, "disinformation" was discussed in the Russian media and by Russian politicians in relation to the disinformation of the Soviet era, and to differentiate Boris Yeltsin's new Russia from its Soviet predecessor.

In the post-Yeltsin era, Russian disinformation has been described as a key tactic in the military doctrine of Russia. Its use has increased under the leadership of Vladimir Putin since 2000, particularly after the 2008 Russian invasion of Georgia. This style of disinformation propaganda has been described as a "firehose of falsehood" by observers due to its high number of channels and willingness to disseminate outright falsehoods, to the point of inconsistency. It differs from Soviet-era disinformation tactics in its use of the internet, claimed amateur journalism, and social media.

Debunking Russian disinformation 
The European Union and NATO both set up special units to analyze and debunk falsehoods. NATO founded a modest facility in Latvia to respond to disinformation. An agreement by heads of state and governments in March 2015 let the EU create the European External Action Service East Stratcom Task Force, which publishes weekly reports on its website "EU vs Disinfo." The website and its partners identified and debunked more than 3,500 pro-Kremlin disinformation cases between September 2015 and November 2017.

In 2016, the US set up the "Global Engagement Center" (GEC) as a division of the United States Department of State to oppose foreign propaganda efforts.

When explaining the 2016 annual report of the Swedish Security Service on disinformation, the representative Wilhelm Unge stated: "We mean everything from Internet trolls to propaganda and misinformation spread by media companies like RT and Sputnik." RT and Sputnik were created to focus on Western audiences and function by Western standards, and RT tends to focus on how problems are the fault of Western countries. Russia's television outlet RT (formerly known as Russia Today) and the Sputnik news agency are state-sponsored media.

Social media platforms and the internet
In the 2010s, as social media gained prominence, Russia then began to use platforms such as Facebook, Twitter, and YouTube to spread disinformation. Russian web brigades and bots, typically operated by Russia's Internet Research Agency (IRA), were commonly used to disseminate disinformation throughout these social media channels. As of late 2017, Facebook believed that as many as 126 million of its users had seen content from Russian disinformation campaigns on its platform. Twitter stated that it had found 36,000 Russian bots spreading tweets related to the 2016 U.S. elections. Elsewhere, Russia has used social media to destabilize former Soviet states such as Ukraine and Western nations such as France and Spain.

In 2020, the US State Department identified several "proxy sites" used by Russian state actors "to create and amplify false narratives." These sites include the Strategic Culture Foundation,  the New Eastern Outlook, Crimea-based news agency NewsFront and SouthFront, a website targeted at "military enthusiasts, veterans, and conspiracy theorists."

Internet Research Agency 

Following the Snow Revolution protests against the outcomes of the 2011 Russian legislative election organized by several persons, including Pussy Riot, Anton Nossik, and Alexei Navalny, who used Facebook, Twitter, and LiveJournal blogs to organize the events, Vyacheslav Volodin, who was Deputy Prime Minister at the time and later became First Deputy Chief of Staff of the Presidential Administration of Russia and was responsible for domestic policy, was tasked with countering these efforts and began to rein in the internet using Prisma which "actively tracks the social media activities that result in increased social tension, disorderly conduct, protest sentiments and extremis" by monitoring in real time from more than 60 million feeds about the protesters discussions on blogs and social networks and perform social media tracking which later led to establishing the Internet Research Agency. Nossik claimed that the Twitter fueled events in 2009 in Moldova known as the Twitter Revolution and the events of Arab Spring, which Igor Sechin blamed Google for masterminding the revolution in Egypt, were not as devastating to Putin as the events of the Snow Revolution during 2011-2012. Putin announced on 24 April 2014 that numerous laws would be enacted to restrict freedoms of expression on the internet through Orwellian censorship and were signed into law by Vladimir Putin on 5 May 2014 with enforcement beginning on 1 August 2014, according to Nossik.

Twelve of the thirteen Russian nationals indicted by Robert Mueller for conspiracy meddling in the 2016 US Presidential Election were employees of the Internet Research Agency, based in St. Petersburg, Russia. In the runup to and during the 2020 U.S. presidential election, Russia's Internet Research Agency (IRA) demonstrated evolved tactics for spreading disinformation. Probably to evade the detection mechanisms of social media platforms, the IRA co-opted activists working for a human-rights focused Ghanaian NGO to target black communities in the U.S. Russian campaigns have also evolved to become more cross-platform, with content spreading, not only on Facebook and Twitter, but also on Tumblr, Wordpress, and Medium. The IRA is also more emboldened, with evidence that they recruited U.S. journalists to write articles critical of U.S. presidential candidate Joe Biden.

Russian Institute for Strategic Studies 

During both the 2016 and the 2020 elections, the Russian Institute for Strategic Studies (RISI) or (RISS) or (RISY) was integral to disinformation efforts from Putin and the Kremlin. During the 2016 elections, Leonid Reshetnikov headed RISI and during the 2020 elections Mikhail Fradkov headed RISI. During the 2016 presidential election, George Papadopoulos met several times with Panos Kammenos who had numerous close ties to Russian intelligence, Vladimir Putin and the Kremlin group tasked with interfering in the 2016 United States elections. Kammenos formed the Athens-based Institute of Geopolitical Studies which in November 2014 signed a "memorandum of understanding" with the former SVR officer Reshetnikov who headed RISI. In 2009, RISI, which had been an SVR operation, was placed under control of the Russian president with Reshetnikov regularly meeting with Putin and participated in Russian interference in the 2016 United States elections by developing plans of action: for example, with Russian intelligence assets and using a large disinformation campaign, Putin would support Republicans and the Trump campaign and disrupt Democrats and the Clinton campaign, and, if Trump were likely to lose the 2016 election, then Russia would shift its efforts to focus upon voter fraud in the United States in order to undermine the legitimacy of the United States electoral system and the elections. Kammenos' positions followed closely with the Kremlin's talking points.

Johan Backman supports RISI's interests in Northern Europe.

Russia's numerous disinformation attacks including support for white supremist activities and attacks of Biden’s mental fitness were utilized by Donald Trump, senior Trump Administration officials, and his re-election campaign. Brian Murphy, who was acting chief of intelligence at the Department of Homeland Security from March 2018 until August 2020, said that he was instructed "to cease providing intelligence assessments on the threat of Russian interference in the United States, and instead start reporting on interference activities by China and Iran." Chad Wolf, who was acting secretary of the Department of Homeland Security, said that Robert O'Brien, who was President Trump's national security advisor, had the assessments of Russian interference suppressed. John Cohen, who was under secretary of intelligence at the Department of Homeland Security during Barack Obama's presidency, stated "By blocking information from being released that describes threats facing the nation... undermines the ability of the public and state and local authorities to work with the federal government to counteract the threat."

Conservative media
Lev Parnas, Igor Fruman, Yuriy Lutsenko, John Solomon, Dmytro Firtash and his allies, Victoria Toensing and Joe diGenova were noted in a Fox News internal report Ukraine, Disinformation, & the Trump Administration: a Full Timeline of Events, which was written by Fox News senior political affairs specialist Bryan S. Murphy and made public by Marcus DiPaola, as indispensable "in the collection and domestic publication of elements of this disinformation campaign" and numerous falsehoods. 

On 3 February 2022, John "Jack" Hanick, who helped established the Konstantin Malofeev owned Tsargrad TV in 2015, allegedly was working to establish similar networks in Greece and Bulgaria, and worked at Fox News as a founding producer and news director from 1996 to 2011, was arrested in London for violating sanctions against Malofeev. Hanick was the first person criminally indicted for violating United States sanctions during the Russo-Ukrainian War.

During the Russo-Ukrainian War, Russian state TV channel Russia-1 has used Tucker Carlson interviews on Fox News to support the Kremlin's objectives in Ukraine. Carlson's interview with the pro-Russia Retired Colonel Doug Macgregor was aired on Russia-1 to demoralize Ukraine. Another interview by Carlson of Tulsi Gabbard, who often appears on Fox News as a guest, was shown on Russia-1 to support the Kremlin's position in which Gabbard said "President Biden could end this crisis and prevent a war with Russia by doing something very simple: guaranteeing that Ukraine will not become a member of NATO, because if Ukraine became a member of NATO, that would put U.S. and NATO troops directly on the doorstep of Russia, which — as Putin has laid out — would undermine their national security." Russia-1 removed parts of the interview before Gabbard said, "The reality is that it is highly, highly unlikely that Ukraine will ever become a member of NATO anyway." Additionally, numerous clips of Carlson have appeared on RT, which was formerly known as Russia Today or Rossiya Segodnya, that support the Kremlin's objectives.

See also 
 Active measures
 Media freedom in Russia
 Russian information war against Ukraine
 Strength is in truth

Notes

References

External links
EU vs Disinfo  and archived website from 24 November 2015

Disinformation operations
Psychological warfare techniques
Propaganda in Russia
21st century in Russia